"Billy Bayou" is a song written by Roger Miller.

Song background
It's a slightly comic song about a larger-than-life character, having adventures in America in the 1800s.

Chart performance
"Billy Bayou" was released as a 1958 single by Jim Reeves, where the recording spent a total of 25 weeks on the country chart and was his fourth release to reach No. 1, where it stayed for five weeks. It also reached number 9 peak position on Italy's FIMI National Charts in 1958. The B-side of "Billy Bayou" titled "I'd Like to Be", which peaked at number eighteen on the country chart.

Cover versions
The song has been covered by other artists, including: 
Burl Ives
Charley Pride
Doug Kershaw

References

1958 singles
Jim Reeves songs
1958 songs
Songs written by Roger Miller